Philippa Kate Roles OLY (1 March 1978 – 21 May 2017) was a Welsh discus thrower who competed at two Olympic and four Commonwealth Games. Roles was British junior athlete of the year – an honour presented at Buckingham Palace. She was the first British discus thrower to medal at junior European level; and narrowly missed out on a medal at under 23 level, finishing 4th. She competed at the 2004 Summer Olympics in Athens and at the 2008 Summer Olympics in Beijing.

Born in Neath, she studied at Neath Port Talbot College from where she gained her degree, and was resident in London. Roles worked for the train operating company Southern as a train driver on services in South London. She represented Swansea Harriers at club level. Proudly Welsh, she was a popular member of Team Wales and Team GB due to her sense of humour and self-deprecating manner.

Her personal best throw was 62.89 metres, achieved in June 2003 in Loughborough. This placed her third on the British outdoor all-time list, behind Meg Ritchie and Venissa Head. It also ranked her in the World top 20.

On 16 July 2008, Roles appeared as Jonny Saunders' guest in the feature "Who's in the Locker, Cocker?" on Chris Evans Drivetime on BBC Radio 2.

She was 5 ft 10 inches tall and weighed 88 kg.

Roles died suddenly and unexpectedly on 21 May 2017 aged 39.

International competitions

References

External links

Philippa Roles at the British Olympic Association

1978 births
2017 deaths
Sportspeople from Neath
Welsh female discus throwers
British female discus throwers
Olympic female discus throwers
Olympic athletes of Great Britain
Athletes (track and field) at the 2004 Summer Olympics
Athletes (track and field) at the 2008 Summer Olympics
Commonwealth Games competitors for Wales
Athletes (track and field) at the 1998 Commonwealth Games
Athletes (track and field) at the 2002 Commonwealth Games
Athletes (track and field) at the 2006 Commonwealth Games
Athletes (track and field) at the 2010 Commonwealth Games
British Athletics Championships winners
Swansea Harriers Athletics Club